Gulf Coast Regional Blood Center is the only blood provider in Houston and its surrounding communities 24 hours a day, 7 days a week. It is one of the largest independent community blood centers in the United States serving 26 counties from the  Texas Gulf Coast to Brazos Valley to East Texas. The nonprofit supplies blood to more than 170 hospitals and health care institutions including the Texas Medical Center, the largest medical center in the world. Gulf Coast Regional Blood Center is a proud member of the  American Association of Blood Banks (AABB), Blood Centers of America, South Central Association of Blood Banks, Texas Medical Center and America's Blood Centers. Operations started on January 1, 1975, with 64 employees. Today, Gulf Coast Regional Blood Center has over 650 staff members. The overall supervision of Gulf Coast Regional Blood Center's activities is the responsibility of a chief executive officer appointed by the board of trustees. Medical supervision and direction for Gulf Coast Regional Blood Center are provided by a Chief Medical Officer also appointed by the board of trustees.

Gulf Coast Regional Blood Center's mission is to partner with the community to help save and sustain lives by providing a safe supply of blood, biotherapies, and related services. There is no substitute for blood. It must be voluntarily donated by one person to be given to another. The need for different blood components–red blood cells, platelets, and plasma–is constant. Donating on an ongoing basis helps ensure blood components are always available for the patients we serve. As a 501 (c) (3)  nonprofit, the patients and donors served are at the heart of everything. Every donor is a hero to the families they impact each time they give blood.  

To meet the blood demands in the community, Gulf Coast Regional Blood Center needs about 1,000 donations a day, and all blood donors in the U.S. must be unpaid volunteers. Those units of blood are a vital lifeline for Houston's health care industry and are used in surgeries, cancer treatments and various medical procedures. That is why Gulf Coast Regional Blood Center asks community members to Commit for Life, a partnership between the community and Gulf Coast Regional Blood Center, focused on saving lives today, and in the future.

Hospital partners
Gulf Coast Regional Blood Center is a leading supplier of blood, blood components and related services to fulfill a variety of client's needs. Not just in the Texas Gulf Coast, but worldwide. Gulf Coast Regional Blood Center is accredited, licensed and inspected by the Food and Drug Administration (FDA), American Association of Blood Banks (AABB) and local and state authorities.  

Gulf Coast Regional Blood Center supplies a full range of transfusable products, including special order blood components. It produces products that are selected for specific properties and used for essential research, as well as further manufacturing into blood derivatives and pharmaceuticals.  National Donor Testing Services Laboratory is used 24/7/365 for accurate and rapid detection and confirmation of a variety of infectious and viral disease markers. It is used for ABO/Rh and the detection of antibodies to red cell antigens too. The AABB-accredited Immunohematology Reference Laboratory provides transfusion services and consultation on complex patient cases. Gulf Coast Regional Blood Center maintains a large volume of antigen-typed red cell units, with additional access to rare units through the American Rare Donor Program.

Programs 
Gulf Coast Regional Blood Center maintains a variety of programs with and for the community, providing exciting opportunities for all to save lives. The Blood Center offers promotion drives throughout the year as a thank you to our donors for giving blood and offer donor rewards. Programs at Gulf Coast Regional Blood Center:

Commit for Life- Every donor becomes a part of the Commit for Life program, a partnership between the donor and Gulf Coast Regional Blood Center. Giving on an ongoing basis helps ensure blood components are always available for patients in the Houston area, Brazos Valley and East Texas. Commit for Life donor rewards program is one small way Gulf Coast Regional Blood Center thanks each donor that helps save lives. Volunteers can become part of the Commit for Life program too. Donors and volunteers will get points that can be redeemed for e-gift cards in the Donor Rewards Store.

BioLinked - More than 16,000 clinical studies are occurring at any one time in the United States. These studies could provide cures or treatments for diseases that affect our friends and neighbors. This progress is often delayed for many years because scientists cannot locate people to participate in their research. By helping researchers locate willing participants, we are doing our part in bringing new hope to patients. Bio-Linked is an electronic roster of people willing to help researchers find cures and treatments. You submit a confidential, self-managed profile of only the medical and social information you are willing to offer. This allows us to find people who meet research needs anonymously.

Milestone Mug-Celebrating milestones with the Milestone Mug program. Donors earn special mugs for each 1,5,10,15 and 20-gallon donations. Afterward, donors will get a mug for every 10-gallons given.

Cellular Life Solutions-Gulf Coast Regional Blood Center has over 44 years of industry experience in serving the largest medical campus in the world. Cellular Life Solutions is Gulf Coast Regional Blood Center's innovative program to expand work in the field of cellular therapy. Cell-based immunotherapy is currently at the forefront in the development of new treatments for serious diseases.

Friends of the Blood Center-A community partner program at Gulf Coast Regional Blood Center. Local businesses and organizations offer perks and incentives to donors for donating blood.

See also
Blood bank
Blood products
Blood donation

External links
 Gulf Coast Regional Blood Center
 The Blood Center East Texas
 The Blood Center of Brazos Valley
 Commit for Life blood donation blog
 Gulf Coast Regional Blood Center Programs
 Host a Blood Drive

References

Transfusion medicine
Non-governmental organizations
Institutions in the Texas Medical Center
Medical and health organizations based in the United States